ITC Officina is a font superfamily designed by Erik Spiekermann and released in 1990. It consists of ITC Officina Sans, ITC Officina Serif and ITC Officina Display, with bold, italic, and small-caps variations of each.

Sources 

 Typedia

External links 

 Official website

Officina
Officina
Officina
Officina